Úlibice is a municipality and village in Jičín District in the Hradec Králové Region of the Czech Republic. It has about 300 inhabitants.

Administrative parts
The village of Řeheč is an administrative part of Úlibice.

References

Villages in Jičín District